Kevin Janssens (born 29 May 1986 in Turnhout) is a Belgian professional football player, currently playing for Wezel Sport. His best position is left-midfielder.

Career
He made his senior debut for K.V. Turnhout in third division, and was transferred to second division team Lierse in December 2008. He achieved promotion with Lierse to the highest level in 2010, but was quickly loaned out to his former club Turnhout, who had also achieved promotion in 2010. With Turnhout, Janssens was relegated back to third division but received a new chance at the highest level of Belgian football when he signed a 2-year deal with Cercle Brugge. In 2013, he signed for Belgian Second Division team SC Eendracht Aalst.

References
 
 
 Cerclemuseum.be 

Living people
1986 births
Belgian footballers
Association football midfielders
Belgian Pro League players
Challenger Pro League players
Sportspeople from Turnhout
KFC Turnhout players
Lierse S.K. players
Cercle Brugge K.S.V. players
S.C. Eendracht Aalst players
K.F.C. Dessel Sport players
Footballers from Antwerp Province
21st-century Belgian people